The COVID-19 pandemic in Texas is a part of the ongoing viral pandemic of coronavirus disease 2019 (COVID-19), a novel infectious disease caused by severe acute respiratory syndrome coronavirus 2 (SARS-CoV-2). The state of Texas confirmed its first case on February 13, 2020, among U.S. nationals evacuated from China to Joint Base San Antonio–Lackland beginning in early February; however, retrospective analyses have suggested a much earlier origin than previously thought. The first documented case of COVID-19 in Texas outside of evacuees at Lackland was confirmed on March 4 in Fort Bend County, and many of the state's largest cities recorded their first cases throughout March. The state recorded its first death associated with the disease on March 17 in Matagorda County.

, Texas has the second-highest number of confirmed cases in the United States, behind California, and the 26th highest number of confirmed cases per capita. It has the third-highest number of deaths related to the virus, behind New York and California, and the 24th-highest count of deaths per capita.

Although Texas had a higher concentration of cases, it had fewer deaths. As of late May 2021, there were 50,198 COVID-19 related deaths reported in that state. The death rate in Texas was 175 for every 100,000 people, while national COVID-19 death rate was 179 per 100,000.

As of April 3, 2021, vaccination in Texas lagged behind the US average, with rates lower than in three of four neighboring states, having administered 12,565,129 COVID-19 vaccine doses, equivalent to 43,334 doses per-100,000 of the state's population.

Timeline

The initial origin of community spread in Texas remains unclear, but numerous anecdotal accounts by those later confirmed have included onset dates as early as December 28 in Point Venture, and retrospective analyses have found unexplained statistical increases in deaths during this time. Testing capacity across the state remained extremely limited until after the first recorded cases were announced.

Research from Austin Public Health conducted in May found 68 COVID-19 patients in Central Texas who began reporting symptoms dating back to around the beginning of March. On March 2, San Antonio Mayor Nirenberg issued a public health emergency after an individual positive for the virus is mistakenly released from quarantine at JBSA–Lackland. Two days later, the Texas Department of State Health Services (DSHS) reported a presumptive positive test result for COVID-19 from a resident of Fort Bend County in the Houston area. A man in his 70s was the first known positive case of the disease in Texas outside of those evacuated from Wuhan and the Diamond Princess cruise ship. The patient had recently traveled to Egypt and was hospitalized. DSHS commissioner John Hellerstedt called the confirmation a "significant development" but indicated that "the immediate risk to most Texans is low."

On March 5, at least eight cumulative cases, including both positive and presumptive positive cases, were identified in the Houston area. The cases involved individuals in the counties of Fort Bend and Harris counties. All individuals with confirmed cases were part of a group that traveled to Egypt in February, including the first confirmed case in Fort Bend County. The travel group rode aboard the Nile River cruise ship MS A'sara. Additional individuals are also investigated as possible carriers in the Houston area in connection with the Egypt trip. The state announced six public health laboratories within its Laboratory Response Network capable of testing for COVID-19.

On March 8, JBSA–Lackland received approximately 100 evacuees from the cruise ship Grand Princess following a localized outbreak on board. Rice University became the first university in the state to enact significant cancellations, suspending in-person classes and undergraduate labs during the week in response to an employee testing positive in connection with the viral cluster that traveled to Egypt. The next day, the cumulative number of confirmed cases in Texas reported by the DSHS surpassed 10. That same day, a resident in his 30s of Frisco, a suburb of Dallas in Collin County, received a presumptive positive test for the virus, having recently traveled to Silicon Valley in California. He was the first case identified in the Dallas–Fort Worth metropolitan area. His wife and 3-year-old child later contracted the disease, with the latter among the youngest confirmed to have the virus in the U.S.

On March 11, local health officials reported a positive test for COVID-19 in Montgomery County, and identified as the first possible case of community spread—not directly related to travel or known contact with positive travelers—in Texas and in the Houston area. The patient's attendance of a barbecue at the Houston Livestock Show and Rodeo on February 28 was reported as a possible but unconfirmed source of the virus. The city of Houston ordered the Houston Livestock Show and Radio to close after announcing an emergency health declaration. Montgomery Independent School District in the Houston area and Alvarado Independent School District in the Dallas area were the first two public school districts in Texas to temporarily close classes over COVID-19, affecting approximately 12,400 students across 17 schools.

On March 13, Governor Abbott declared a state of disaster for all counties in Texas, invoking emergency powers for the his administration, and ordered state employees to remote work. Day cares, nursing homes, and prisons were asked to limit visitations. The state's first mobile testing center for COVID-19 opened in San Antonio. Colleges and universities throughout the state extended spring breaks with some transitioning to online instruction, including Baylor University, the University of Houston, the University of North Texas, the University of Texas at Austin, Texas State University, and Texas Tech University. School districts also announced temporary suspensions of classes statewide.

On March 17, DSHS reported that a man in his 90s in Matagorda County died of COVID-19 after being hospitalized, becoming the first official COVID-19 fatality in Texas. The Texas National Guard was activated, making Texas the 21st U.S. state to activate its National Guard; the security force was not yet deployed. Abbott granted waivers to hospitals to bolster unused bed capacity without applying or paying added fees. Abbott also asked the Small Business Administration to declare an Economic Injury Disaster Declaration for the state, with eligibility granted three days later.

On March 19, the cumulative number of confirmed cases in Texas reported by the DSHS surpassed 100. The DSHS declared a public health disaster, marking the first such declaration since 1901. DSHS Director Hellerstedt issued the disaster declaration as the disease "has created an immediate threat, poses a high risk of death to a large number of people and creates a substantial risk of public exposure because of the disease's method of transmission and evidence that there is community spread in Texas." Abbott issued four executive orders to ban gatherings of more than 10 people; discourage eating and drinking at bars, food courts restaurants, and visiting gyms (and close bars and restaurant dining rooms); proscribe visitation of nursing homes, retirement centers, and long-term care facilities with exception of providing critical care; and temporarily close all Texas schools.

On March 26, the cumulative number of confirmed cases in Texas exceeded 1,000, and Abbott mandated visitors flying from Connecticut, New Jersey, New York, and New Orleans, Louisiana, to self-quarantine for 14 days. A team of researchers at the University of Texas at Austin projected that the healthcare capacity of Greater Austin would be exceeded if "extensive social distancing measures" were not implemented. Their findings indicate that a 90 percent compliance scenario would maintain hospitalizations within capacity through August 17.

On April 17, Abbott announces the start of his plan to reopen the Texas economy, citing a "semi-flattened curve" of COVID-19 cases in the state. The reopening was outlined in three executive orders allowing for state parks to open under social distancing regulations on April 20, limiting nonessential surgeries at hospitals beginning after April 21, and product pickup at retail stores beginning April 24. The reopening process also established the Strike Force to Open Texas, an advisory panel to Abbott for reopening economy. The panel was led by James Huffines with Mike Toomey as chief operating officer; its consulting members are all members of the Republican Party. The panel also consisted of a medical team and a special advisory council. Abbott also called for public schools to remain closed for the rest of the 2019–2020 academic year. Ten days later, pursuant to the executive order establishing the Strike Force to Open Texas, Abbott released the Texas Governor's Report to Open Texas, putting forth a phased approach to reopen the state's economy.

On May 5, Abbott modified his earlier reopening timetable, allowing barbershops, hairdressers, and nail salons to begin reopening on May 8 while maintaining social distancing. Gyms and exercise facilities were allowed to reopen beginning May 18 while operating at quarter occupancy. On May 18, Texas entered Phase 2 of the governor's reopening plan. On June 3, Texas enters Phase 3 of Abbott's reopening plan.

On June 23, the state reported more than 5,000 new cases of COVID-19 in a single day for the first time, documenting 5,489. Hospitalizations related to COVID-19 also reached a record high with 4,092. Abbott gives approval for mayors and county judges to enact restrictions on outdoor gatherings with more than 100 people, reducing the size limit from 500. Abbott also indicated that respirator enforcement is within the purview of local officials. Abbott ordered the HHSC to reinstate COVID-19 health and safety standards at child care centers, reversing the agency's lifting of those requirements on June 12. Two days later, a record-high number of new COVID-19 cases, 5,996, was set for the third consecutive day in Texas; the three days contribute over 17,000 cases to the cumulative case count. Abbott paused the reopening of the businesses in the state as hospitalizations deaths and new COVID-19 cases begin to quickly rise, though prior relaxations of COVID-19 restrictions remain in place.

On June 26, Abbott began rolling back some of the lifted restrictions from his earlier state reopening plan, issuing an executive order that promptly closed bars except for takeout and curbside pickup and closed rafting and tubing businesses in addition to restricting indoor dining at restaurants to 50 percent capacity. The order also required most outdoor gatherings with at least 100 people to seek approval by local governments. Harris County Judge Lina Hidalgo evaluated the county as having reached the highest threat level, indicating a "severe and uncontrolled level of COVID-19", and called for the reinstatement of a stay-at-home order for the county in addition to prohibiting outdoor gatherings with more than 100 people in unincorporated parts of the county.

On July 2, Abbott mandated the wearing of face coverings in public spaces, with fines for non-first time offenders. Counties with 20 or fewer active cases, children under 10, and persons with interfering medical conditions were allowed to opt-out of the order, as well as people attending church, voting at polling places, or exercising outdoors. Austin Mayor Adler issued an executive order restricting gatherings with more than 10 people outside of child-care services, religious gatherings, and recreational sports.

On August 11, 2020, Texas became the third state in the U.S. after California and Florida to exceed 500,000 in total number of reported cases. On a per capita basis Texas ranks 12th among US states, with Louisiana, Florida, Arizona, Mississippi and Georgia leading the list. By October 29, 2020, larger hospitals in Amarillo, Lubbock, and El Paso did not have space available to accept transfers of seriously ill COVID patients from rural areas.

During the fifth wave of infections in August 2021, demand for ICU beds in at least 50 Texas hospitals reached or exceeded 100% of ICU capacity. A surge in hospitalizations among children caused Houston and Dallas to run out of pediatric ICU beds, with Houston resorting to an air lift evacuation in one case. Dallas County Judge Clay Jenkins told parents that "if your child is in a car wreck, if your child has a congenital heart defect or something and needs an ICU bed or more likely if they COVID and need an ICU bed...your child will wait for another child to die. Your child will just not get on a ventilator." On August 17, 2021, it was announced that Governor Abbott had tested positive for COVID-19. He had been fully vaccinated against COVID-19 and began taking Regeneron's monoclonal antibodies.

Epidemiology 
The first positive test result for COVID-19 in Texas, outside of the evacuees quarantined at JBSA–Lackland from China and the Diamond Princess cruise ship, was reported by the DSHS on March 4 and involved a resident of Fort Bend County. The patient was a man in his 70s and had traveled on the Nile River cruise ship MS A'sara in Egypt. A total of 12 positive test results were reported in Fort Bend and Harris counties from travelers aboard the same ship. The first case of possible community spread—where the source of infection is unknown—was reported by public health officials on March 11, involving a man in his 40s in Montgomery County; he had recently attended a barbecue at the Houston Livestock Show and Rodeo on February 28. The first death in Texas identified in connection with COVID-19 occurred on March 14 from a man in his 90s at the Matagorda Regional Medical Center; Matagorda County officials reported the death on March 15 and the DSHS confirmed it the following day. According to the DSHS, the state exceeded 100 total cases of COVID-19 by March 19 and 1,000 cases by March 26. By the end of March 2020, there were 3,266 known cases of COVID-19 and 41 fatalities in Texas, with nearly half of the state's counties reporting at least one case. An analysis of the first month of COVID-19's spread in Texas, published in the Journal of Community Health, found that while the total case counts were highest in the state's metropolitan areas, the highest incidence rates of the disease per capita occurred in Donley County, with 353.5 cases per 100,000 people. The case fatality rate (CFR) was 10.3 percent in Comal County; high CFR counties had "a higher proportion of non-Hispanic Black residents, adults aged 65 and older, and adults smoking, but lower number of ICU beds per 100,000 population, and number of primary care physicians per 1000 population."

The cumulative number of COVID-19 cases confirmed by the DSHS reached 10,000 on April 9 and 100,000 on June 19. The number of confirmed fatalities eclipsed 100 on April 4 and 1,000 on May 9. Counties that adopted shelter-in-place orders early showed a 19–26 percent decrease in COVID-19 case growth 2.5 weeks following the enactment of those orders according to an analysis published in the National Bureau of Economic Research. The same analysis found that such orders in urbanized counties accounted for 90 percent of attenuated case growth in the state by May. A surge in new COVID-19 cases began in June with large increases in the state's major cities and within a younger population compared to the beginning of the pandemic.

Responses

State responses 

The government of Texas did not have a coordinated, statewide response to the early stages of the COVID-19 pandemic, relying mostly on local policies. Governor Abbott declared a state of disaster on March 13, 2020, giving him powers to order state-wide public health measures, and prohibited large social gatherings and dine-in service at bars and restaurants on March 19. On March 31, Abbott issued an executive order requiring all residents to remain at their homes unless conducting essential activities, and to minimize gatherings with people from outside of their immediate household. Abbott specifically avoided use of terms such as "shelter-in-place" or "stay-at-home order", as he felt that they did not adequately reflect his goals. A suspension of elective medical procedures faced legal disputes for effectively prohibiting abortions.

In May 2020, Texas began to lift its initial restrictions via a phased timetable, via executive orders superseding all local health orders, the process was paused on June 25 due to a surge of cases, and Abbott rolled back some of the orders the next day, including reducing restaurant capacity to 50%, closing bars, and prohibiting unapproved gatherings of more than 100 people. On July 2, Abbott announced that the wearing of face masks would be mandated in enclosed public spaces in counties with a minimum number of cases, and gatherings of more than 10 people without government approval would be prohibited. On September 17, capacity limits for businesses were raised to 75%.

On March 2, 2021, as COVID-19 vaccines began to be administered throughout the country, Abbott announced the final phase of reopening. All remaining COVID-19 restrictions in Texas would be lifted effective March 10 via an executive order that supersedes all local orders. It only allowed the reinstatement of restrictions on businesses in counties where COVID hospitalizations accounted for more than 15% of their local bed capacity for at least seven days. However, business capacity could not be lowered below 50%. In addition, all mask mandates were lifted, and all jurisdictions are prohibited from enforcing mask mandates. Abbott stated that residents had " "mastered the daily habits to avoid getting COVID", and thus enforceable public health orders were no longer necessary. The action was considered premature by President Joe Biden and other health experts. The city of Austin continued to enforce its mask mandate, resulting in a threat of legal action by the Texas Attorney General. On March 26, District Judge Lora Livingston blocked a request by the AG for a temporary injunction against a retaliatory lawsuit filed by Austin, thus allowing the enforceable mandate to remain in force.

Following the lifting of all restrictions, the state government imposed further restrictions on COVID-19-related public health measures; in April, Abbott issued an executive order prohibiting state agencies from issuing "vaccine passports" or requiring proof of vaccination with COVID-19 vaccines that are currently administered pursuant to Emergency Use Authorization (EUA). In July, a bill was signed prohibiting private businesses from requesting proof of vaccination from their customers. Later that month, despite rising cases, Abbott strictly prohibited counties from imposing capacity restrictions on businesses, even if they have a large number of COVID-19-related hospitalizations. On August 26, the prohibition of proof of vaccination by state agencies was extended to any COVID-19 vaccine, even if approved by the FDA.

Local responses 
On March 2, San Antonio Mayor Ron Nirenberg and Bexar County both declared a "local state of disaster and a public health emergency" after an individual was mistakenly released from quarantine at Joint Base San Antonio by the CDC before a third test for coronavirus returned a positive result. The city subsequently petitioned the federal government to extend the quarantine of US nationals at Joint Base San Antonio; the petition was denied by Judge Xavier Rodriguez in the United States District Court for the Western District of Texas. Both the city of Dallas and Dallas County have declared a "local disaster of public health emergency".

Abbott left the decision to local governments to set stricter guidelines. Two hours later, Dallas County Judge Clay Jenkins ordered residents of Dallas County to shelter in place beginning 11:59p.m. on the following day. A day later on March 23, Bell, Bexar, Brazos, Cameron, Hunt, McLennan, Stephens counties and the city of Forney, issued a shelter in place for their communities. Collin, Galveston, Harris, Travis, and Williamson counties issued same measures on March 24. However, Collin County had more relaxed guidelines for their shelter in place order. Collin County's order stated that all businesses are essential and would be allowed to remain open as long as they followed physical distancing guidelines.

In Austin, where the South by Southwest festival was closed, many bar owners on Sixth Street boarded their windows to protect the stock they had amassed in preparation for the cancelled event. A street art campaign decorated the boarded businesses with art capturing the mood of lockdown.

In mid-June 2020, some county officials requested that the governor grant them the power to fine individuals for not wearing a mask in public, as local governments were prohibited from doing so by the governor's order; the governor refused. Nelson Wolff, the Bexar County judge, found a loophole in the order, and on June 17 issued an order fining businesses for allowing in customers without a mask. Other counties and cities followed suit. In response, the governor said this had been the "plan all along", which some local officials doubted, and that the judge "finally figured that out". This angered some people in areas where people had been dying of COVID-19.

Nacogdoches County sheriff Jason Bridges announced he would not be enforcing the statewide mask order, because it was "borderline infringing on some ... constitutional rights", even though legal experts agree such measures are constitutional under the state's police power. Bridges said enforcing public health measures during the pandemic "is not something we have time to be doing", despite health experts' agreement that mask wearing reduces transmission significantly.

During a July 14 press conference, Houston Mayor Sylvester Turner along with Dr. David Persse and Houston Fire Department Chief Sam Pena announced that the Army medical task force arrived Monday July 13 to help ramp up the city's response to COVID-19 with plans to open more facilities as medical resorts. Over the weekend prior, Turner said he proposed a two-week shutdown to Abbott to help curb the soaring rates; Hidalgo, an early proponent of extending the shutdown, voiced support for another shut down. During a July 15 press conference, Turner announced 16 new COVID-19 related deaths as well as two new testing sites to handle the demand of residents seeking testing in response to the surging coronavirus cases, calling for a minimum 90 percent compliance from residents for the safety measures to be effective. In a July 15 press conference, Houston Mayor Sylvester Turner announced 16 new COVID-19 related deaths as well as two new testing sites to handle the demand of residents seeking testing in response to the surging coronavirus cases, calling for a minimum 90 percent compliance from residents for the safety measures to be effective.

On October 29, Texas Attorney General Ken Paxton challenged a two-week shutdown of nonessential businesses ordered by El Paso County Judge Ricardo Samaniego. El Paso had daily case counts of over 1,000 per day, and hospitals were overwhelmed, with 44% of patients under treatment for COVID-19.

Business and community responses 
H-E-B, in January 2020, activated a comprehensive pandemic emergency management plan first conceived in 2009 in response to concerns over H1N1. Other essential businesses collectively began limiting operational hours, providing previously in-store experiences in palatable to-go forms, restricting points of entry, and requiring use of sanitizer or face masks for all customers. Many restaurants began offering pre-prepared ingredients to recreate their experiences at home, and a resurgence of drive-in theaters was seen particularly in the Greater Austin and Greater San Antonio areas.

Economic and social impact

Crime

A survey conducted by KPRC-TV found an increase in homicide and car theft. In Houston the murder rate went up 39%. Law enforcement officials report a rise in fraud and identity theft as well and say they have been receiving more phone calls for assault, domestic violence, mental health related complaints and drug use. Police and psychologists have attributed the rise in crime to changes in behavior brought on by the extreme stress and anxiety of the pandemic. Some police officers blame bond reform too likening it to a "catch and release system". Police reported increased cooperation on investigating groups of individuals who travel from city to city committing robberies and other property crimes. Some jurisdictions have seen more cases of purse snatchings and people being followed from ATMs.

Effect on businesses

On March 13, Six Flags (based in Texas) suspended operations to all twelve of their properties nationwide as well as in Mexico, that were operating in the month of March, until the end of the month; these include the two Texas parks, Six Flags Fiesta Texas and Six Flags Over Texas. On March 30, the closure was extended to all of their properties. Sea World San Antonio announced plans to close from March 16 to April 1, along with all Schlitterbahn waterparks, the parks have delayed the closure. Both Schlitterbahn waterparks announced they'd be the first major water park in the state to reopen in mid-June. The two Texas Six Flags parks will reopen the parks on June 19.

On March 14, H-E-B announced that all of their stores across the state will reduce open hours, to help restock items. This also includes their pharmacies and Central Market locations. The announcement comes a day after the company announced that its Houston area stores would be the only locations to implement changes to their operations. A month later, H-E-B expanded their store hours across the state (closer to normal store hours), as supply availability has improved.

As of May 26, KVUE reported that "The Texas Restaurant Association estimates that 6% of restaurants in Austin have shut down for good during the pandemic, and that number is estimated to be at 12% statewide". A number of these restaurants that closed had been famous and well-established in the state for decades. Some notable ones include Highland Park Cafeteria, a Dallas restaurant that had served comfort food for 95 years, and Threadgill's, an 81-year old tavern that was the first post-Prohibition Austin business with a beer license before becoming a restaurant in 1981 (Janis Joplin started her music career here).

Abbott's plans to lift the stay-at-home order and reopen Texas was followed by a spike in coronavirus cases reaching 50,000 new cases by Memorial Day weekend. The number rose consistently pushing Texas to chart at the top of cases nationwide and hospitals in the state's largest cities reaching near or full ICU capacity. In response to the resurgence of COVID-19 cases, Abbott issued an executive order shutting down bars for a second time since the beginning of the pandemic. Several Texas bar owners filed a $10 million federal lawsuit stating that Abbott's order violates their constitutional rights; the order impacted restaurants with high alcohol sales as well, with the Texas Restaurant Association estimating that at least 1,500 restaurants that serve alcohol were forced to close, which displaced more than 35,000 employees.

Event cancellations
For the first time in the event's history, South by Southwest was cancelled as a result of local health concerns about the coronavirus pandemic. The Houston Livestock Show and Rodeo cancelled the rest of the event on March 11, that was slated to run until March 22. It was confirmed that a resident from Montgomery County, Texas that was tested positive, attended the BBQ cook off at the rodeo on February 28. The attendance for the rodeo on February 28, was 77,632, with 73,433 of the visitors went to the "World Championship Barb-B-Que Contest," where that person attended.
The FIRST Championship, slated to occur in Houston around mid-April, was canceled due to the Coronavirus, along with all the other FIRST competitions in Texas. The Championship is one of the world's largest gatherings in competitive robotics.

After the announcement of the ban of gatherings of over 500 people on March 13 (in San Antonio), Fiesta San Antonio postponed their event to November 2020, that was originally slated for mid-April and eventually cancelled to April 2021, and then later pushed to June 2021.

Austin City Limits Music Festival, originally scheduled for October 2020, was cancelled on July 1; its organizers describing the cancellation as "the only responsible solution."

Impact on education

Among the closures of school districts and universities across the state, Abbott waived all State of Texas Assessments of Academic Readiness (STAAR) testing for the 2019–20 school year for public grade schools on March 16.

On March 19, Abbott issued an executive order that closed schools statewide until at least April 3. On March 31, the Governor announced that schools in the state will continue to stay closed until May 4. On April 17, Abbott said that Texas public schools would be closed for the remainder of the 2019–20 school year and that schools will continue to offer distance learning.

As of July 16, the state had still not established concrete rules for school reopenings in the Fall, but the latest word from Abbott on July 14 was that districts can expect more flexibility on opening classrooms, with state education officials agreeing to continue to fund school districts who choose to stay virtual if mandated by local health officials.

K-12 schools 

Houston Independent School District, the state's largest school district, was among dozens of school districts extending their spring break, to help prevent the spread of the coronavirus. The closures were not without precedent, as many schools closed for two weeks during the 2009 H1N1 flu when Houston experienced a major outbreak. The CDC issued guidelines for K-12 school administrators to help "protect the health, safety, and wellbeing of students, teachers, other school staff, their families, and communities" as they prepare to return to school in fall 2020.

Universities 
As of May 19, University of Texas at Austin disclosed that they were rolling out a series of "financial mitigation measures" to alleviate employee furloughs and other economic distress from COVID-19, even after receiving government grants. On May 20, it was announced that UT-Austin would open the campus for the Fall semester of 2020, but would conduct all classes and tests remotely after Thanksgiving break. They later announced on June 3 that classrooms would be kept at 40 percent capacity, and that around 2,100 classes (about a fifth of all available classes) will be conducted online during the fall. On June 8, both UT-Austin and Texas A&M University announced that wearing masks will be required when inside campus buildings during the Fall 2020 semester. On June 23, UT Austin announced that it is waiving SAT and ACT testing requirements for high school students who apply for fall 2021 undergraduate admission to ensure that COVID-19 does not affect a student's ability to apply to the university.

Sports 

All major professional sports leagues in Texas suspended play, including the NBA (Dallas Mavericks, Houston Rockets and San Antonio Spurs) NHL (Dallas Stars), Major League Baseball (Texas Rangers and Houston Astros), and Major League Soccer (Houston Dynamo and FC Dallas). The XFL (Dallas Renegades and Houston Roughnecks) suspended play, and later filed for bankruptcy part-way into the rebooted league's inaugural season. In April 2020, the University Interscholastic League (UIL) cancelled all spring high school sports state-wide.

On May 28, Governor Abbott announced that professional sporting events at outdoor venues would be allowed to admit a limited number of spectators, capped at 25% of normal capacity, and subject to approval by health authorities. In June 2020, Fort Worth hosted the first IndyCar Series and PGA Tour events held since pandemic-related restrictions took effect, the Genesys 300 at Texas Motor Speedway, and the Charles Schwab Challenge at Colonial Country Club. Both events were held without spectators.

The pandemic impacted sports across the state at all levels: Texas high school started voluntary summer workouts on June 8 in anticipation of a full season return, but the UIL recommended all workouts statewide be postponed from July 3–13 as a safety measure, impacting around 200 schools across the state, many of which had already made the decision to shut down independently ahead of official orders. Professional teams such as the Houston Rockets were further impacted as players tested positive for COVID-19. On July 21, the UIL announced its plan to resume fall sports, splitting them into two categories: football and volleyball practices would begin first with 1A through 4A schools on August  3, schools with 5A and 6A designations would resume practices on September 7, with state football championships held in January.

To reduce travel and the impact of outbreaks, Major League Baseball scheduled its 2020 playoffs at neutral sites in Texas and California; Minute Maid Park in Houston and  newly opened Globe Life Field in Arlington would host National League Division Series games during the postseason, while the 2020 National League Championship Series and 2020 World Series would be hosted entirely in Arlington (marking the first World Series to be held at a single ballpark since 1944). The NLCS and World Series would also be the first MLB games that season to admit spectators, capped at a capacity of 11,500 out of around 40,000. Citing looser restrictions in comparison to its traditional home of Las Vegas, the National Finals Rodeo also relocated to Globe Life Field.

To take advantage of the loosened restrictions, the Texas Rangers announced that they would not cap their capacity for their home opener against the Toronto Blue Jays on April 5. The team did not limit capacity for a pre-season exhibition series against the Milwaukee Brewers either, although they only attracted 12,911 and 10,859 spectators respectively. The official attendance for the home opener was 38,238, nearly 95% capacity.

Corrections
In November 2020 the University of Texas at Austin concluded that from March to October, 231 prisoners in the state died due to COVID-19. Due to the delay in announcing whether someone died from the disease, which can take as long as several months, Vox reported that "The 231 figure is likely to be a conservative count."

Based on an early 190 deaths count, UT Austin issued a report stating that the death rate of people in correctional supervision in Texas was 135% the general death rate.

The Texas Department of Criminal Justice (TDCJ) banned prisoner visitation on March 12, 2020, and resumed it on March 15, 2021. The agency vaccinated prison staff but as of February 2021 the prisoners did not yet receive them.

Statistics

See also
 Timeline of the COVID-19 pandemic in the United States
 COVID-19 pandemic in Austin, Texas – for impact on Texas's state capital
 COVID-19 pandemic in the United States – for impact on the country
 COVID-19 pandemic – for impact on other countries
 COVID-19 County Projections

References

Further reading

External links 

 Coronavirus information from the Texas Department of State Health Services
 List of COVID-19-related county orders from the Texas Association of Counties
 COVID 19 emergency ordinances as of April 13 from the Texas Oil & Gas Association
 Wikiversity:COVID-19/All-cause deaths/Texas

COVID-19 pandemic in Texas
Texas
COVID-19 pandemic
COVID-19 pandemic
Disasters in Texas
Health in Texas